No Job for a Lady is a British sitcom that aired on ITV between 7 February 1990 and 10 February 1992. Starring Penelope Keith, it was written by Alex Shearer, and directed and produced by John Howard Davies. It was made by Thames Television for ITV.

Cast
Penelope Keith – Jean Price MP
Mark Kingston – Geoff Price
Garfield Morgan – Norman (Whip)
Paul Young – Ken Miller
George Baker – Sir Godfrey Eagan MP (series 1 and 2)
Brogden Miller – Freddy
Nigel Humphreys – Harry
Jonathan Dow – Tim (series 1)
Paul Rattigan – Mark  (series 2)
Michael Cochrane – Richard (series 3)

Note: In the four Series One episodes in which Nigel Humphreys appeared, he was credited as Nigel Humphries.

Plot
No Job for a Lady revolves around Jean Price, the newly elected, somewhat rebellious Labour MP for an inner-city constituency, and her life in the House of Commons. She is married to Geoff Price, who is a public defender and takes care of many of the household chores so that Jean pursue her new career. The show follows Jean while she balances her personal life with parliamentary duties, including "woman's issues," which Jean alternately fights for and is frustrated by, as other MPs think she cares about nothing else as she's a woman.  She often is surprised by other MPs duplicity and hypocrisy, holding them to a higher standard.

The Commons' chamber is never seen, with scenes alternating between Jean's office, which she shares with her Scottish colleague Ken Miller, the lobby, and various lounges of Westminster. Other characters include the whip Norman, and the Conservative MP Sir Godfrey Eagan, various visiting constituents, and Jean's secretary, Marc.

Episodes

Series One (1990)
Who goes Home? (7 Feb 1990)
The Maiden Over (14 Feb 1990)
There should be a law against it! (21 Feb 1990)
Questions, Questions! (28 Feb 1990)
A member of the Committee (7 Mar 1990)
Take a Copy! (14 Mar 1990)

Series Two (1991)
Strange Bedfellows (7 Jan 1991)
But I voted for you! (14 Jan 1991)
White Knights (21 Jan 1991)
Poetic Justice (28 Jan 1991)
Undesirable Aliens (4 Feb 1991)
No rumour in the Truth (11 Feb 1991)

Series Three (1992)
Hawks and Doves (6 Jan 1992)
A bed for the night (13 Jan 1992)
Sugar and Spice (20 Jan 1992)
I'd like to see you do it! (27 Jan 1992)
What Care? What Compensation? (3 Feb 1992)
Lobby Terms (10 Feb 1992)

DVD release
All three complete series of 'No Job for a Lady' have been released on DVD by Network, with a 3-disc set released by Acorn Media in 2012.

References

External links
.
.

ITV sitcoms
1990 British television series debuts
1992 British television series endings
1990s British sitcoms
1990s British political television series
British political comedy television series
Television series by Fremantle (company)
Television shows produced by Thames Television
English-language television shows
Television shows set in London